Narcís Martí Filosia (born 15 September 1945) is a Spanish retired footballer who played as an attacking midfielder.

Club career
Born in Palafrugell, Girona, Catalonia, Martí Filosia arrived at FC Barcelona in the 1966 summer, from neighbours CD Condal (he would later be loaned to the same club). He made his official debut on 16 October under Roque Olsen, playing the full 90 minutes in a 0–2 derby loss against RCD Español at the Sarrià Stadium; it was his only appearance of the season.

In the following eight La Liga campaigns, Martí Filosia played alongside the likes of Juan Manuel Asensi, Johan Cruyff, Carles Rexach, Salvador Sadurní or Hugo Sotil, being used mostly as an attacking backup and winning three major titles, notably the 1974 national championship. He retired in June 1977 after a couple of years in Segunda División with UE Sant Andreu, also in his native region.

Honours

Club
Barcelona
Inter-Cities Fairs Cup: 1965–66, 1971
La Liga: 1973–74
Copa del Generalísimo: 1967–68, 1970–71

Country
Spain U18
UEFA European Under-18 Championship: Runner-up 1964

References

External links

FC Barcelona profile

1945 births
Living people
People from Baix Empordà
Sportspeople from the Province of Girona
Spanish footballers
Footballers from Catalonia
Association football midfielders
La Liga players
Segunda División players
CD Condal players
FC Barcelona players
UE Sant Andreu footballers
Spain youth international footballers
Spain amateur international footballers
Catalonia international footballers